The Millennium Centar is a multi-purpose indoor arena located in the city of Vršac. It is the home ground of basketball club KK Vršac and ŽKK Vršac and has a capacity of 4,400 seats. The arena is also used for concerts and other live entertainment.

History
The arena was officially opened on April 5, 2001. The arena hosted the Group A of the EuroBasket 2005, the basketball competitions of the 2009 Summer Universiade and the Group D of the 2012 European Men's Handball Championship.

Concerts & events
 Svetlana Ceca Ražnatović performed a concert as part of her Poziv Tour promoting her album Poziv on 5. April 2014.

See also
List of indoor arenas in Serbia

References

External links
 Official website

Indoor arenas in Serbia
Basketball venues in Serbia
Buildings and structures in Vojvodina
Sport in Vršac
KK Hemofarm
2012 European Women's Handball Championship
Buildings and structures celebrating the third millennium
2001 establishments in Serbia
Sports venues completed in 2001